Top Chef: California is the thirteenth season of the American reality television series Top Chef. The season was announced by Bravo on April 14, 2015. Similar to Top Chef: Texas, filming took place in several locations across California, including San Francisco, Los Angeles, San Diego, Santa Barbara, Oakland, and the greater Palm Springs area, concluding with a finale in Las Vegas, Nevada. Top Chef: California had a two-night premiere on December 2–3, 2015. Host Padma Lakshmi and head judge Tom Colicchio returned, alongside judges Gail Simmons, Emeril Lagasse, and Richard Blais, among others. The companion web series, Top Chef: Last Chance Kitchen, also returned, premiering immediately following the second part of the season premiere on December 3, 2015. In the season finale, Jeremy Ford was declared the winner over runner-up Amar Santana. Isaac Toups was voted Fan Favorite.

Contestants
Seventeen chefs were selected to compete in Top Chef: California, including one returning contestant, Grayson Schmitz, who originally competed in Top Chef: Texas.

Kwame Onwuachi returned for Top Chef: Colorado, competing in the Last Chance Kitchen. Karen Akunowicz returned for Top Chef: All-Stars L.A. Amar Santana returned for Top Chef: World All-Stars.

Contestant progress

: The chef(s) did not receive immunity for winning the Quickfire Challenge.
: Angelina lost the Sudden Death Quickfire Challenge and was eliminated.
: Amar lost the Sudden Death Quickfire Challenge and was eliminated.
: As the winner of the Quickfire Challenge, Jeremy automatically advanced to the finale; therefore, he did not have to compete in the Elimination Challenge.
: Amar won Last Chance Kitchen and returned to the competition.
 (WINNER) The chef won the season and was crowned "Top Chef".
 (RUNNER-UP) The chef was a runner-up for the season.
 (WIN) The chef won the Elimination Challenge.
 (HIGH) The chef was selected as one of the top entries in the Elimination Challenge, but did not win.
 (IN) The chef was not selected as one of the top or bottom entries in the Elimination Challenge and was safe.
 (LOW) The chef was selected as one of the bottom entries in the Elimination Challenge, but was not eliminated.
 (OUT) The chef lost the Elimination Challenge.

Episodes

Last Chance Kitchen

References
Notes

Footnotes

External links
 Official website

Top Chef
2015 American television seasons
2016 American television seasons
Television shows set in California
Television shows filmed in California
Television shows filmed in Nevada